Coopers Hall Winery and Taproom, or simply Coopers Hall, is an urban winery and restaurant in Portland, Oregon.

Description
Eater Portland Mattie John Bamman has described Coopers Hall as a "massive, warehouse-chic urban winery and taproom".

History
Coopers Hall opened in 2014. The winery hosted an event befitting the Ovarian Cancer Alliance of Oregon and SW Washington on Saint Catherine's Day in 2014, featuring prominent women from the local food and beverage industries, live music, and food. Coopers Hall hosted the closing party for Chefs Week in 2015.

The restaurant debuted a happy hour menu in 2016, featuring burgers, hors d'oeuvres, beers, cocktails, and wines. Coopers Hall had stopped using drinking straws by 2018. In 2019, the winery began offering three Willamette Valley wines (Cascadia White, Pinot Noir, and Rose of Pinot Noir) in refillable bottles as part of a collaborative project with BottleDrop and the Oregon Beverage Recycling Cooperative.

In 2020, during the COVID-19 pandemic, Coopers Hall hosted 'Coopers Hall-iday Market' in November featuring 25 local vendors, and offered patio service on New Year's Eve. Nicholas Restaurant began using Coopers Hall wine in 2021.

Reception
In Eater Portland 2019 list of "Portland's Unreal Wine Bars", Alex Frane and Brooke Jackson-Glidden wrote, "Often used as a wedding venue, this lofty and bright urban winery has an underrated food menu, with everything from dandelion caesars to foraged-mushroom-laden pastas. Cooper's Hall's wines come from a massive wall of taps, a more sustainable alternative to the typical collection of bottles that also allows for easy tastings."

See also
 List of New American restaurants

References

External links

 
 Coopers Hall at Zomato

2014 establishments in Oregon
Buckman, Portland, Oregon
New American restaurants in Portland, Oregon
Restaurants established in 2014
Wineries in Oregon